The Sturt Baseball Club known as the Saints is a baseball club in Adelaide, South Australia. The Saints compete in the South Australian Baseball League managed by Baseball South Australia. Baseball SA is governed by the Australian Baseball Federation.

The club was formed in 1908.

The Saints play their home games at Sturt Baseball Club, cnr High Street and Old Belair Road, Mitcham.

In Season 2018/19 we ran 15 competitive teams in the following age groups;

 Under 11s, 13s, 15s and 17s
 Senior Women - Division 1
 Senior Men - Divisions 1, 2, 3, 4, 5, 6 and 7

T-Ball for 4 - 9 year olds is held on Friday nights.

External links
Sturt Baseball Club
Baseball South Australia

Australian baseball clubs
Sporting clubs in Adelaide
Baseball teams established in 1908
1908 establishments in Australia